Hana (also Romanized as Hanā, Ḩannā, and Ḩannā’) is a city in the Central District of Semirom County, Isfahan Province, Iran. At the 2006 census, its population was 5,358, in 1,335 families.

References

Populated places in Semirom County

Cities in Isfahan Province